Stingray Juicebox is a Canadian discretionary music specialty channel owned by Stingray Group. It is a commercial-free channel that broadcasts music and music videos aimed towards children and teens.

The channel was first established in 2001 by Craig Media as MTV2; it operated as a licensed version of the U.S. channel of the same name, and acted as a sister to its MTV Canada channel. The service was licensed by the CRTC as part of a planned suite of five channels devoted to specific genres of music videos; MTV2 was the only channel of the suite to launch. After the sale of Craig to CHUM Limited in 2004, the channel was relaunched in 2005 as PunchMuch—an interactive spin-off of MuchMusic featuring viewer-voted music videos.

In 2011 under Bell Media ownership, the network adopted its current format. In 2016, Juicebox and its sister channels were sold to Stingray Digital.

History

As MTV2
In November 2000, Craig Broadcast Systems Inc. (later known as Craig Media) was granted approval from the Canadian Radio-television and Telecommunications Commission (CRTC) to launch a specialty service called "Music 5" that would consist of five separate music video channels that would each focus on a specific musical genre – dance, pop, urban, R&B and "hot hits".

Before any of the channels had launched, in August 2001, Craig announced that it had reached an agreement with MTV Networks to license the MTV brand in Canada for several their channels. Although it was expected that 3 MTV branded genre-specific music channels would launch, on December 6, 2001, only one channel was launched, the channel devoted to "Pop", as MTV2. Shortly after the launch, MTV Networks acquired a minority interest in the channel, along with sister network MTV Canada. MTV2 was structured as a free-form music video channel that aired music videos from various artists from different genres aimed at teenagers to young adults, in addition to a small number of concert series including the MTV Canada original series, Pepsi Breakout.

In April 2004, CHUM Limited announced it would purchase Craig Media for CAD$265 million; Craig's interest in MTV2 was included in the sale. The sale was approved by the CRTC on November 19, 2004, and the transaction was completed two weeks later on December 1.

As PunchMuch
After the sale, MTV Networks chose to terminate its licensing agreement with Craig due to a clause in the contract allowing it to end it if a change in control occurred. CHUM was required to pay CAD$10 million in licensing fees to MTV Networks for the time remaining in their contract. The contract termination also meant that MTV Networks was no longer able to retain interest in the channel. On June 9, 2005, CHUM announced it would rebrand the channel on June 30 as PunchMuch, changing the format to an automated music video service that would allow viewers the ability to request music videos and participate in on-screen chat, polling, and other interactive participation with their mobile phone. MTV Canada was rebranded Razer on the same day.

In July 2006, Bell Globemedia (later CTVglobemedia) announced that it would purchase CHUM for an estimated CAD$1.7 billion, including PunchMuch. The sale, also needing approval from the CRTC, was approved on June 8, 2007, with the transaction completed on June 22. After a three-year absence, the MTV2 brand returned in Canada when CTVglobemedia rebranded Razer as MTV2 on August 1, 2008.

From its inception, the channel had operated as an advertiser-supported service; on August 31, 2009, PunchMuch and its sister channels MuchLoud, MuchMoreRetro, and MuchVibe all switched to commercial-free formats, while MuchMusic and MuchMoreMusic would continue to run commercials during programs.

Ownership changed hands once again when on September 10, 2010, Bell Canada (a minority shareholder in CTVglobemedia) announced that it planned to acquire 100% interest in CTVglobemedia for a total debt and equity transaction cost of $3.2 billion CAD. The deal was approved by the CRTC on March 7, 2011, and was finalized on April 1 of that year, on which CTVglobemedia was rebranded Bell Media.

As Juicebox

PunchMuch was subsequently rebranded as Juicebox on November 17, 2011, focusing on music videos aimed at children, with an emphasis on videos aimed at preteen audiences. The videos on the channel were approved by a committee consisting of parents and employees, who determine the appropriateness of a specific video for the channel's target audience. As part of the channel's relaunch as Juicebox, CTV began airing a two-hour block of Juicebox-branded music videos on Saturday mornings, and even running commercials unlike the actual channel, later abandoned in April 2016, when they sold the service to Stingray Group.

On June 21, 2016, it was announced that Stingray Digital would acquire Juicebox and its sister channels from Bell Media; the networks were sold for $4 million. The deal for Juicebox would later close on August 15, 2016, with the channel changing its name to Stingray Juicebox on August 12, 2016.

On June 1, 2017, Stingray announced the completion of the rebranding process for all four music video channels, which included new programming and a national promotional campaign.

Since its launch in 2019, a number of television providers have replaced Juicebox with Stingray Country, although the channel continues to be available on some providers.

References

External links
Official site
Channel description

J
Music video networks in Canada
Television channels and stations established in 2001
Commercial-free television networks
Digital cable television networks in Canada
English-language television stations in Canada